Lewys is a Welsh masculine given name. Notable people with the name include:

Lewys Daron ( – c. 1530), Welsh poet
Lewys Dwnn (c. 1550 – c. 1616), Welsh poet and genealogist
Lewys Glyn Cothi (c. 1420 – c. 1490), Welsh poet
Lewys Glyn Dyfi (1826–1891), Welsh preacher and writer
Lewys Morgannwg (fl. 1520 – 1565), Welsh poet
Lewys Môn (fl. 1485 – 1527), Welsh poet
Lewys Twamley (born 2003), Welsh footballer

See also
Llywelyn
Lewis
Lewy

Welsh masculine given names